XHEIN-FM is a radio station on 89.9 FM in Cintalapa de Figueroa, Chiapas. The station is known as Extremo Grupero.

History
XHEIN began as XEIN-AM 810, with a concession awarded on April 19, 1976. The station moved to 560 in the 1990s before migrating to FM.

References

Radio stations in Chiapas
Radio stations established in 1976